Systems Biology in Reproductive Medicine is a peer-reviewed medical journal that covers the use of systems approaches including genomic, cellular, proteomic, metabolomic, bioinformatic, molecular, and biochemical, to address fundamental questions in reproductive biology, reproductive medicine, and translational research. The journal publishes research involving human and animal gametes, stem cells, developmental biology, toxicology, and clinical care in reproductive medicine.

Editor 
The editor-in-chief of Systems Biology in Reproductive Medicine is S. A. Krawetz (Wayne State University).

References

External links 
 

Publications established in 1978
Obstetrics and gynaecology journals
Bioinformatics and computational biology journals
Taylor & Francis academic journals
Bimonthly journals
English-language journals